Empezar Desde Cero (English: Starting From Zero) is the fifth studio album by Mexican pop group RBD, released simultaneously in Mexico and the United States on November 20, 2007.

The album contains two songs composed by two of RBD's band members: Alfonso Herrera and Christopher Uckermann. Empezar Desde Cero falls into the genres of Latin pop and pop rock. The album received a nomination for 'Best Pop Album by a Duo/Group with Vocals' at the 9th Annual Latin Grammy Awards in 2008.

In the United States, Empezar Desde Cero debuted at #1 on both the Billboard Top Latin Albums and Billboard Latin Pop Albums charts, while peaking at #60 on the main Billboard 200 chart. In Mexico, the album reached #4 on the Mexican Albums Chart and sold 100,000 copies there, attaining a Platinum certification, as well as a 4×Platinum certification for pre-loaded sales of 400,000 copies. In Spain album peaked at #4 on the Spanish Albums Chart.

As part of the album's promotion, the album's lead single, "Inalcanzable", was released on October 8, 2007. The single peaked at #6 on the US Billboard Hot Latin Songs chart, becoming the group's last top-ten hit on the ranking, but reached #2 on the US Billboard Latin Pop Songs subchart. On January 29, 2008, the second single off the album, the title track "Empezar Desde Cero", was released. The song's main vocals are performed solely by Maite Perroni. Lastly, the third and final single from the album, "Y No Puedo Olvidarte", was released on June 5, 2008. The song was promoted by a live performance at the 2008 Premios Juventud but did not count with the support of a music video as the album's previous two singles.

Background 

In 2006, RBD released their third studio album, Celestial, and immediately the group started a world tour to promote the album, the Tour Celestial. Months after the tour had started, in 2007, the group announced that the recording sessions for a new album could start after the end of the tour. Contrary to what was stated by the group, with the Tour Celestial still ongoing and in the midst of the group's hectic promotion and business events schedules, RBD started to record Empezar Desde Cero on August 30, 2007. The album's recording process lasted a month and was held in studios in Mexico and Burbank, California.

Different to RBD's previous studio albums, Empezar Desde Cero contained songwriting by some of the group's members. In addition to self-written songs by the group's members, the album contained more full solo tracks than the group's earlier albums. Previously, it was Christopher Uckermann and Alfonso Herrera who were lacking in solo-tracks, but for Empezar Desde Cero they both wrote their solo songs featured on the album; "Sueles Volver", composed and performed by Christopher, and "Si No Estás Aquí", written and performed by Alfonso. A demo version of the first leaked onto the Internet in May 2007, even before the album was announced.

Artwork 
For the album's cover, a picture of RBD in front of a simple black backdrop was used. The typography used was also very simple and used red highlighting in some words. On the album's cover, the six members of RBD are seen seated in wooden benches and chairs. Anahí appears reclining on a wooden bench wearing a leather jacket over a green dress, holding a strand of her hair. Behind her, Christian is seen wearing a black sweater over a white T-shirt and khaki baggy pants. The singer is seen holding Maite's hand, who appears wearing a black dress and sitting behind Dulce María. The group's famous redhead is sitting in a wooden bench besides Anahí, also wearing a black dress, but under a grey sweater. Behind her is Alfonso, wearing a black leather jacket, and Christopher seated at his side, dressed similarly. Regarding the album cover's photo shoot, Alfonso commented: "It's not that overproduced in regards to the wardrobe, it's rather ultra-relaxed because as the album's title says, it's staring from zero."

Production and release 
In August 2007, RBD's manager, Pedro Damián, announced the release of the new album for late November of that year. Damián also revealed that around twelve songs were selected for the album, after having listened to approximately 1,000 songs, and that at the same time, the album could contain songs written by the group's members. During the first "Worldwide RBD Day" press conference, on October 4, 2007, RBD themselves confirmed the name of the album and announced it would in fact have its release in November. Later it was further confirmed that the album would be released worldwide on November 20, 2007.

The album was recorded in Mexico and Burbank, California. Empezar Desde Cero was produced by Carlos Lara and Armando Ávila and contains 13 songs, some of which had members of RBD itself participating in their composition, like "Sueles Volver" and "Si No Estás Aquí. The first single released to promote Empezar Desde Cero was "Inalcanzable", a song written by Carlos Lara, which was released to radio stations worldwide on October 8, 2007.

Wal-Mart stores, which first released the album's official track list, also released an enhanced version of the album which featured a bonus DVD entitled Así Es RBD. The bonus DVD included a one-hour documentary of never before seen footage, music videos, scenes from RBD's originating telenovela, Rebelde, and live performances.

On January 29, 2008, the album's second single was announced to be "Empezar Desde Cero". The single was chosen by fans through an online poll on the group's official website.

On February 8, 2008, Empezar Desde Cero was finally issued in Argentina as a special edition, which included as bonus tracks some of RBD's hits from their previous studio albums.

The album's last single was "Y No Puedo Olvidarte", which did not receive the same promotion as part of RBD's record label, EMI. This was due to the fact that the single was released at the same time RBD announced their disbandment, therefore provoking the cancelation of any remaining promotion for Empezar Desde Cero to give way to the recording of the group's last studio album.

Empezar Desde Cero is RBD's second studio album and first Spanish album to not have a Portuguese-languaged version released in Brazil.

Promotion

Singles 
The album's first single was "Inalcanzable". The song was confirmed as the official lead single during RBD's press conference for the first "Worldwide RBD Day", held on October 4, 2007. On October 8, 2007, the song was made available for purchase as a digital download. The single reasched #2 on Billboard magazine's Latin Pop Songs chart and peaked at #6 on Billboard Hot Latin Songs. The song was well received by music critics and garnered award nominations on Premios Lo Nuestro, Premios Orgullosamente Latino and Premios Juventud. The song's official remix, which featured reggaeton duo Jowell & Randy and reggaeton solo artist De La Ghetto, won the award for 'The Perfect Combo' at the 2008 Premios Juventud. The song's music video was directed by Esteban Madrazo and shot on November 7, 2007, and won the award for 'Latin Video of the Year' at the 2008 Premios Orgullosamente Latino.

On January 29, 2008, the album's second single was released, the title track "Empezar Desde Cero". The single was chosen through a poll conducted by the Esmas website. The song's main vocals are performed only by Maite Perroni, with the rest of the group doing the choruses. The single debuted at #17 on Billboard Latin Pop Songs and at position #42 on Billboard Hot Latin Songs. The single's 1980s-style music video was filmed on February 28, 2008 in Mexico City and was premiered on March 25, 2008 on Ritmoson Latino. The music video for "Empezar Desde Cero" was also directed by Esteban Madrazo, who had directed the video for "Inalcanzable", as well as the group's previous videos for "Ser O Parecer" and "Celestial".

On June 5, 2008, the last single from Empezar Desde Cero was announced, "Y No Puedo Olvidarte". The single did not have the support of a music video due to the sudden announcement of the group's disbandment. The song was performed live on July 17, 2008 during the 2008 Premios Juventud, being this the group's first and last time to perform the song at an awards show.

No Digas Nada was sent to Brazilian radio, as well to serve as the album's fourth single, but the plan was eventually canceled.

Live performances 

The promotion schedule for Empezar Desde Cero started on November 1, 2007, when RBD performed "Inalcanzable" for the first time at the 'Evento 40' in Mexico. Also in November 2007, the sextet presented the single on the Mexican TV show Mojoe. On December 12, 2007, the group appeared without Alfonso at the FOX Sports Awards, where they performed their single "Inalcanzable". On December 15, 2007, the group appeared on the 1st Annual Mi TRL Awards by MTV Tr3s, and also performed "Inalcanzable". Also in December 2007, the group appeared on the Mexican Teletón and performed singles from their previous albums as well as "Inalcanzable".

On January 26, 2008, RBD appeared on the 'Evento Oye' in Mexico City to again perform "Inalcanzable". On February 1, 2008, RBD appeared on the festivities prior to Super Bowl XLIII and performed their biggest hits and "Inalcanzable". On February 10 the group appeared on the Mexican show En Familia con Chabelo to perform both "Inalcanzable" and "Empezar Desde Cero". On February 24 the group appeared on Boomerang's Boom Box en Estudio to perform "Inalcanzable". Also in 2008, the group performed "Inalcanzable" on the Latin American musical variety TV show Noche de Estrellas, hosted by Mexican singer Yuri. On March 4, 2008, the group appeared on the American morning show ¡Despierta América! to perform "Empezar Desde Cero" and "Inalcanzable". That same day, the sextet appeared on Escándalo TV to again perform both singles. On March 20, 2008, RBD performed "Inalcanzable" on the US TV special Feliz 2008, hosted by Don Francisco. On March 25, 2008, the group appeared in Spain's TVE gala, where they again performed their successful single "Inalcanzable". In April 2008, RBD appeared again on the 'Evento 40' in Mexico, organized by Los 40 Principales, to perform "Inalcanzable", "Empezar Desde Cero" and their soon-to-be-released single, "Y No Puedo Olvidarte". On June 19, 2008, the band performed at the Exa TV concert in Mexico, but with the absences of Anahí, due to sickness, and Maite, due to filming Cuidado con el Ángel.

On July 13, 2008, RBD performed the album's last single, "Y No Puedo Olvidarte", on the second season of Ya es 1/2 Día en China. In this occasion the group again lacked the presence of Maite. On July 17, 2008, the group appeared on the 5th Annual Premios Juventud, where they gave a superhero-themed performance of "Y No Puedo Olvidarte". On this performance, Maite was also not present due to the filming of her telenovela Cuidado con el Ángel. On July 19, 2008, the band performed at the concert organized to celebrate the 50-year anniversary of Televisa in Monterrey, Mexico, where they sang "Y No Puedo Olvidarte" and "Inalcanzable". On July 24, 2008 the group is seen present at the Colombian TV show El Programa del Millón performing their last single, "Y No Puedo Olvidarte". Lastly, on October 25, 2008, RBD performed at the Exa TV concert in Mexico, which was broadcast live through the Mexican television network TeleHit, and there ended the promotion for Empezar Desde Cero and gave way to the start of their farewell tour.

Tours 

On February 15, 2008, RBD started their promotional tour for Empezar Desde Cero throughout the United States, visiting 17 cities in the country. On April 11, 2008, the Empezar Desde Cero Tour continued its trek throughout Latin America.

The tour received mostly positive reviews and enjoyed great commercial success. On April 19, 2008, the group held a concert in Bolivia, where they gathered more than 21,000 spectators. RBD returned to Brazil and sold out all tickets for the six concerts they held in the country, gathering 12,000 people in Rio de Janeiro, 7,000 people during three consecutive nights in São Paulo, and another 6,000 concertgoers in Manaus. In Brasilia, the group held a concert in front of more than 500,000 people, breaking the record held there by The Rolling Stones, and there filmed their fifth concert DVD, Live in Brasilia. In September, the group held a series of concerts in Slovenia, where tickets for their first two scheduled shows sold out in only 30 minutes, shattering ticket sale records in the country.

By mid-2008, American concert tour trade publication Pollstar announced the 100 most successful concert tours of the year up to that point; RBD reached #49 with 166,839 tickets sold from January 2008 up until June of the same year. 
By 2008's third trimester, Pollstar ranked RBD at #48 in the Top 100 concert tours for the sales of 301,015 tickets sold from January to September 2008. By the end of the year, the final numbers by Pollstar, which gathered data from January to December 2008, showed that RBD had a total of 367,346 concert tickets sold in 2008. RBD ranked in $4,400,000 just in North American ticket sales.

The tour arrived to its end on October 4, 2008, as the group announced its separation and gave way to their last concert tour, the Gira del Adiós World Tour. The farewell tour started on November 1, 2008 and had some of the songs from Empezar Desde Cero as part of its setlist. On November 29, 2008, in São Paulo, Brazil, the group's sixth and last concert DVD,Tournée do Adeus, was filmed. The DVD was released almost a year later on November 25, 2009, only in Brazil.

Critical reception 

Empezar Desde Cero received mostly positive reviews, many critics describing the album as "mature" and praising the musical evolution of RBD's six members, especially the three females. Jason Birchmeier, from the music guide website AllMusic, described the album as not being "as much fun as [RBD's] earlier recordings, particularly their free-spirited debut album, the enjoyably frivolous Rebelde (2004)", but that "it's a welcome turn toward maturity for the teen pop stars", adding that "the result is a batch of songs with more thoughtful lyrical themes and more heartfelt performances from RBD". Birchmeier ended his review by stating that some of the songs on Empezar Desde Cero "might be RBD's best songs to date. They're so good, even RBD haters may be pleasantly surprised." Judy-Cantor Navas, director of online music service Rhapsody, did not rate the album, but stated that she believed that, similar to what Jason Birchmeier of AllMusic commented in his review, that the album "could signal the start of a more mature phase for RBD."

Leila Cobo, editorial reviewer for Walmart.com, commented that "Empezar Desde Cero is more of the same RBD, meaning, catchy, pretty pop that sticks very closely to the winning formula", and argued that "the bulk of Empezar is female driven (honestly, they are better singers and theirs are the best tracks)". Cobo finished her review by stating: "Be sure to stick with Empezar Desde Cero all the way to the end, and you'll be rewarded with "Extraña Sensación", a dance track that can work both for clubs and shows. Yes, RBD has kept to their catchy formula, but they're also trying to keep in touch with a fan base that is growing up and is now most definitely over 21."

By contrast, Rafael Sartori, from the Terra Networks-affiliated Territorio da Música website, gave the sextet a negative review, rating the album only 2 out of 5 stars. In his review, Sartori argued that "RBD's pop sound is simple and lazy, with arrangements and melodies destined for children", adding that "musically, [the album] doesn't represent any growth", while also stating that the album is only meant to be bought by the group's "fanatics".

Commercial performance 
Empezar Desde Cero garnered great success in North America. In the United States, the album reached #1 on both the Billboard Top Latin Albums and Billboard Latin Pop Albums charts, managing to rank for 22 and 25 weeks on the respective charts. On the Billboard 200, the album reached position #60 and ranked for 5 weeks on the chart. In 2008, Keith Caulfield of Billboard magazine revealed that, according to Nielsen Soundscan, the album managed to sell around 102,000 copies in the United States. In Mexico, the album debuted at #6 on the Mexican Albums Chart. The album ascended to #4, its peak position, on its fifth week on the chart, and managed to rank for 43 weeks on the chart's Top 100. Despite not reaching #1 in Mexico, the album was certified Platinum by the Asociación Mexicana de Productores de Fonogramas y Videogramas (AMPROFON) for the sales of 100,000 copies there. It was also certified 4×Platinum for sales of 400,000 units in pre-loaded format.

In Europe, the album also met with an acceptable reception. In Spain, the album managed to debut at #4 on the Spanish Albums Chart, being this the album's peak position, which it kept for two consecutive weeks. In Croatia, the album entered the Croatian International Albums Chart and reached position #30.

In Argentina, the album reached #17 on the monthly ranking published by CAPIF.

Track listing

 Notes
  signifies a co-producer
 "Amor Fugaz" is the Spanish cover version of Sabrina Salerno's "Love Is All There Is", originally released on Sabrina's album A Flower's Broken (1999).

Empezar Desde Cero Fan Edition 

Empezar Desde Cero was reissued as Empezar Desde Cero (Fan Edition) on June 21, 2008, in Mexico. The re-release CD includes three bonus tracks in addition to the standard Empezar Desde Cero tracklist and a bonus DVD. The DVD features the music videos for the Empezar Desde Cero singles "Inalcanzable" and "Empezar Desde Cero", plus the making-of the videos and karaoke tracks. The album was nominated for a Latin Grammy Award for Best Pop Vocal Album, Duo or Group.

The new tracks are "Te Daría Todo" and "Tal Vez Mañana", written and performed by Dulce María and Maite Perroni, respectively. The third bonus track was the promotional single "Estar Bien", featuring Chilean pop group Kudai and Mexican actress and singer Eiza "Lola" González, which was used to promote the Mexican health-awareness campaign "Elige Estar Bien".

Prior to the release of Empezar Desde Cero (Fan Edition), Maite Perroni's solo song, "Tal Vez Mañana", had leaked onto the Internet along with fellow RBD band member Christopher Uckermann's "Sueles Volver".

The cover art for Empezar Desde Cero (Fan Edition) only included the band's logo in the middle of a bright red circular ring, which was the symbol used to represent the Empezar Desde Cero era, over what seemed to be an old cardboard or crumpled-up paper background.

On June 19, 2008, the promotion schedule for Empezar Desde Cero (Fan Edition) went under way, as RBD performed at the Exa TV concert in Mexico, though with the absences of Anahí, due to sickness, and Maite Perroni, due to filming the telenovela Cuidado con el Ángel. The concert marked the first performance of the song "Te Daría Todo", handled solely by Dulce María.

On July 8, 2008, a press conference was organized for RBD to officially promote Empezar Desde Cero (Fan Edition), also without the presence of Perroni.

On July 19, 2008, the band performed at the concert organized to celebrate the 50-year anniversary of Televisa in Monterrey, Mexico, where they sang "Inalcanzable", "Y No Puedo Olvidarte" and "Te Daría Todo".

On July 27, 2008, the group performed "Estar Bien" together with Kudai at the finale of Colombian TV show El Programa del Millón.

Track listing

 Notes
  signifies a co-producer
 "Amor Fugaz" is the Spanish cover version of Sabrina Salerno's "Love Is All There Is", originally released on Sabrina's album A Flower's Broken (1999).

Personnel 
Credits adapted from the album's liner notes.

Recording locations

Elth Studios (Mexico)

Igloo Music Studios (Burbank, California)

Mixing locations

 Igloo Music Studios (Burbank, California)

 Cosmos Studios (Mexico)

Vocals

RBD – main vocals, choruses
Kudai – featured vocals, choruses Empezar Desde Cero (Fan Edition), track "Estar Bien"
Eiza González – featured vocals, choruses Empezar Desde Cero (Fan Edition), track "Estar Bien"

Armando Ávila – choruses
Facundo Monty – choruses
Giza Vatky – choruses

Musicians

Armando Ávila – acoustic guitar, bass, electric guitar, keyboards, mandolin
Jimmy Johnson – bass
Greg Bissonette – drums
Enrique "Bugs" González – drums
Javo González – guitars
Martín Pérez – guitar

Michael Thompson – guitars
Ruy Folguera – keyboards
Jon Gilutin – keyboards
Czech National Symphony Orchestra – string section
Lee Thornburg – trumpet
Novi Novog – viola

Production

Fernando Grediaga – A&R
Camilo Lara – A&R
Angélica Pérez Allende – A&R coordination
Rafa Arcaute – arrangements
Armando Ávila – arrangements, direction, mixing, programming, producer, vocal direction, vocal recording
Gustavo Borner – arrangements, co-producer, mastering, mixing, recording engineer
Juan Carlos Moguel – arrangements, mixing, vocal recording
Ruy Folguera – arrangements
Pico Adworks – art direction, graphic design
Luis Luisillo Miguel – associate producer
Carlos Lara – concept, direction, producer, vocal direction
Ricardo Gascón – DVD authoring Empezar Desde Cero (Fan Edition)
Carolina Palomo – coordinator
Emilio Ávila – executive producer
Pedro Damián – executive producer
Fernanda Roel – photography
Rotger Ros – production assistant
Daniel Borner – production coordinator
Jorge González Montaut – production coordinator
Justin Moshkevich – recording assistant
Nacho Segura – recording assistant
Joseph "Joe" Greco – recording engineer
Michkin Boyzo – strings conductor
Pepe Ortega – strings recording
Carlos Valdez – vocal direction

Awards and nominations

Charts and certifications

Weekly charts

Monthly charts

Year-end charts

Certifications

Release history

Empezar Desde Cero

Empezar Desde Cero (Fan Edition)

References

2007 albums
RBD albums